Novica Tadić (Smriječno, Plužine, 17 July 1949 – Belgrade, 23 January 2011) was a Serbian poet.

Biography
He was born in a small village in Montenegro and spent most of his life in Belgrade.

His work was supported by many United States poets including Charles Simic,  who translated Night Mail: Selected Poems, Maxine Chernoff, Paul Hoover, David Baratier and Andrei Codrescu.

Works
Presences
Death in a Chair
Maw
Fiery Hen
 Foul Language
 The Object of Ridicule
 Street
 Sparrow Hawk
Ulica i potukač, Oktoih, 1999

Works in English
 
Assembly, Translators Steven Teref, Maja Teref, Host Publications, 2009

Further reading

References

External links
Poem Selection
Article (Serbian)
Two poems by Novica Tadic at Melancholia's Tremulous Dreadlocks

1949 births
2011 deaths
People from Plužine
Serbs of Montenegro
Serbian male poets
20th-century Serbian poets